Manizales  is a city in central Colombia. It is the capital of the Department of Caldas, and lies near the Nevado del Ruiz volcano.

Currently, the city is the main center for the production of Colombian coffee and an important hub for higher educational institutions.

History
Manizales was founded on October 12, 1849. The city was founded by a group of twenty Antioquians (The Expedition of the 20), who came from Neira and Salamina.

Geography
Manizales is the capital city of one of the smallest Colombian departments. The city is described as having an "abrupt topography", and lies on the Colombian Central Mountain Range (part of the longest continental mountain range, the Andes), with a great deal of ridgelines and steep slopes, which, combined with the seismic instability of the area, has required architectural adaptations and public works to make the city safer. Even though Manizales has this very difficult topography, there are many coffee plantations in its fertile lands. The city is located in the northern part of the Colombian Coffee-Growers Axis ("Eje Cafetero"), near the volcano Nevado del Ruiz, which has an altitude of 5,321 meters (17,457.3 ft).

It is in the basin of the Chinchiná River and sub-basin of the Guacaica River. Its natural threats are earthquakes, mudslides, and volcanic eruptions.

Climate
Under the Köppen climate classification, Manizales is Cfb, a subtropical highland climate but ever moist. Lower elevations approach an equatorial climate (Af) as found in the plains. Despite being located in the tropics, the city seldom gets very hot, featuring spring-like temperatures throughout the year owing to its high altitude. There are only two seasons in the city: the wet and dry seasons that alternate throughout the year, with each lasting about three months. Monthly averages are quite uniform.

Economy

Its core economy has traditionally been the cultivation and production of coffee. This fomented the creation of new types of employment and several factories, some of which remain in the metropolitan area while others have reduced their operations or moved to other cities aggravating the unemployment problem. These companies manufacture products such as liquor, shoes, rubber, chocolate, banks, detergents and soaps, threshing and packaged coffee, software, and metallurgy,  among others. In addition, there are institutions and companies involved in the coffee sector as the Departmental Committee of Coffee Growers of Caldas, Almacafé, Cenicafé, and a number of other industries involved in the process of coffee (threshers, cooperatives, exporters).

During the latter half of the twentieth century, many universities were founded in the city to the point that some studies regard Manizales as the second largest University city in the country. The universities are attended by students from various regions of the country such as Tolima, Risaralda, Valle, Quindio, Antioquia, Nariño and Huila, among others.

The service sector has thrived, mostly in the form of call centers, and this has become one of the city's primary economic activities.

Manizales won first place in the special category of business promotion in the V Iberoamerican Digital Cities Award, organized by the Latin American Association of Research Centers and Telecommunication Enterprises (AHCIET). In a 2010 study conducted by the World Bank, Manizales was ranked as the best and easiest Colombian city to do business.

Infrastructure

Main roads 
The city's mountainous topography causes journeying in an east–west direction and vice versa to be flatter and faster than going north–south or south–north; therefore the main parallel thoroughfares are the Santander, Paralela, and Kevin Ángel, and are arranged longitudinally most of the city's length. The few avenues with a north–south or south–north are the Avenida Centenario and Avenida 12 de Octubre; the former is more important, for it connects downtown with the main transport hub where major access routes merge towards the city.

Avenida Santander was the first main road of the city, formerly called Cervantes, and remains the most important motorway of the city. Its four lanes travel in the east–west–east direction. This roadway spans the entire Carrera-23 in the downtown area all the way to Calle 71 in the Battalion sector. Surrounding it are some of the most important landmarks of the city such as: Founders Theatre, Plaza 51, The Triangle, Panorama Towers, University of Caldas, Catholic University, Cervantes Building, Park Antonio Nariño, Instituto Universitario de Caldas, Herbeo Tower, General Cable Plaza and the Zona Rosa.
Avenida Paralela was the city's second main road. It also has four lanes moving between west and east, and as its name attests, it runs parallel to Avenida Santander. This road spans from downtown to Calle 71 in the Palermo neighborhood. It passes by some iconic places such as San Estéban Cemetery, University of Caldas, Palogrande Stadium.
Avenida Alberto Mendoza Hoyos
Avenida Kevin Ángel
Avenida Panamericana

Manizales Aerial Tramway 
Manizales Aerial Tramway was inaugurated on October 30, 2009. Each gondola has a seating capacity of ten passengers, the whole system can carry 2,100 persons per hour. Owing to its success, the gondola lift was extended in 2013, and now connects also the suburb of Villamaria.

The entire Aerial Tramway was built by the Italian manufacturer Leitner ropeways.  Currently it has four stations on its route: Downtown Manizales, La Fuente, Manizales Los Cambulos Bus Terminal, and Villamaria.

Air transportation 
Manizales has a domestic airport called La Nubia Airport which has a runway of about 1,400 meters and provides services from 6 am to 6 pm. Due to foggy weather conditions, it is often closed due to low visibility. Meanwhile, the existence of buildings over two stories close to the landing head make it topographically unfeasible to expand the airport, which in turn has become an obstacle to regional development; For these reasons, the International Coffee Airport is being built within the metropolitan area, in the town of Palestina, 25 minutes from Manizales. At an altitude of 1,525 m, the airport will have a runway of 2,800 meters which could be extended to 3,500 meters in order to receive long-range aircraft. It is expected that the new airport will function 24/7. It is currently being studied for its adequacy in terms of ground motion.

Arts and culture
The most important cultural events held in the city are the Manizales International Theater Festival, which is one of the major theater events in Latin America created in 1968 by initiative of Carlos Ariel Betancur, and the Manizales Jazz Festival, which gathers jazz musicians from all over the world; both are held annually.

The Manizales Fair was created in 1951 on the first centenary of the city. It began with bullfights and the typical "Manolas" parade (Spanish procession). Due to its hospitality, more shows and presentations have been brought into the fair, such as the International Coffee Beauty Pageant which together with the bullfighting season are the main events of the fair. Currently the fair includes activities such as horseback riding parades, artisanal fairs, "trova" concerts, other parades, sports, national and international musicians and bands, horse and livestock contests, and cultural shows. It is an important celebration in Colombia, as is the Barranquilla Carnival.

Coffee International Beauty Pageant

Coffee International Beauty Pageant (from ) is an international beauty pageant held annually in Manizales as part of the Feria de Manizales, a feast promoting the region known for its flagship product, coffee.

The current winner is Maydeliana Liyimar Diaz, from Venezuela.

The international beauty contest originally began in 1957 and was held every two years (1957, 1959, 1961, 1963) under the name of Continental Queen of Coffee. However, to give a wider scope, in 1972 its name was changed to Miss International Queen of Coffee Pageant, thereby increasing the participation of coffee-producing countries from other continents. Manizales is the permanent home since its inception.

Other events
Annual Fair of Manizales (Feria de Manizales) [January]
Bullfighting Season of Manizales [January]
International Coffee Beauty Pageant [January]
Image Festival [April]
International Theater Festival [September/October]
Manizales Jazz Festival [September/October]
Manizales Grita Rock Fest [October]

Attractions

Gold museum of the Banco de la Republica
Museum of Natural History Universidad de Caldas
Museum of Art Universidad de Caldas
Archaeological Museum Universidad de Caldas
Botanical Garden Universidad de Caldas
Natural Museum of Histories CC
Museum of Science and Games Universidad Nacional de Colombia

Tourism
Cathedral of Manizales, the third tallest in Latin America, at 113 meters
Nevado del Ruiz Natural Park (with caves and snow)
Manizales - Mariquita Cableway
Thoughts Recinct Park (El Recinto del Pensamiento)
Los Yarumos Ecological Park
Ruiz Hot Springs ("Thermal Waters")
Otoño Hot Springs ("Thermal Waters")
La Rochela Resort 
Santagueda Resort 
Simon Bolivar square
Bosque Popular park
 (Francisco Jose de) Caldas Park
Manizales Country Club of Golf
Hacienda Venecia - Coffee Plantation tour, accommodation, swimming pool

Sports

Manizales has several sports centers, the main one being in the area of the Palogrande Stadium. The city has a professional football team, Once Caldas, which is housed in the Palogrande Stadium, winner of the prestigious South American Copa Libertadores 2004, and 4-time champion of Category First A of Colombia, ranking eighth in the tournament's history. Manizales has also had two professional basketball teams Caldas Bancafetero Aces and  Wise Caldas which were champions of the Colombian Professional Basketball tournament in 1989 and 2000 respectively, both played in the Coliseo Mayor Jorge Arango Uribe. The city also has indoor soccer presence through the futsal cup microfútbol in both male with Real Caldas FS and female with Real Caldas, and the FIFA Futsal League in Club Deportivo Linear which won the 2011-II championship, all these are played in the Coliseo Menor Vargas Ramón Marín venue.

Manizales has also been home to sporting events such as the Fourth National Games in 1936, South American Football U-20 in 1987, the Copa America 2001, the South American U-20 2005 and most importantly World Cup 2011 U-20.

Education
Manizales is an important regional cultural and educational center. It has more universities per capita than any other city in Colombia. The city has a student population of some 30,000 that attend 7 colleges and universities:
 Universidad Nacional de Colombia
 Universidad de Manizales
 Corporación Universitaria Remington
 Universidad Autónoma de Manizales
 Universidad Católica de Manizales
 Universidad Luis Amigó
 Universidad de Caldas

Twin towns – sister cities

Manizales is twinned with:
 Bayamón, Puerto Rico
 Benidorm, Spain
 Cork, Ireland
 Miami, United States
 Rosario, Argentina
 San Luis Potosí, Mexico
 Soyapango, El Salvador
Liberland

See also
1999 Armenia earthquake

References

External links

Birds from Manizales
Checklist of birds from Manizales and surroundings

 
Populated places in the Caldas Department
Capitals of Colombian departments